Dean Daniel Oliver (born November 5, 1978) is an American former professional basketball player and current assistant coach for the University of Wisconsin men's basketball team.  An undrafted 5'11" (1.80 m) guard from the University of Iowa, Oliver played with the Golden State Warriors from 2001-02 to 2002-03.

Early life and college
Born in Quincy, Illinois, Oliver graduated from Mason City High School in Mason City, Iowa in 1997 as a member of the National Honor Society with a 3.9 GPA. At the University of Iowa, Oliver played in the Hawkeyes basketball team all four years and graduated in 2001 with a Bachelor of Business Administration in finance. In his senior season, Oliver averaged 14.9 points, 2.8 rebounds, and 4.8 assists per game. Oliver was a three-time third-team All-Big Ten Conference selection (1999–2001) and led the conference in assist/turnover ratio in his senior season.

Professional career

Player
In March 1996 and 1997 Oliver and his fellow players lead his team, the Mason City Mohawks, to two state tournament wins. Head coach at the time was Robert Horner, father of player and former Hawkeye, Jeff Horner. Oliver was not drafted in the 2001 NBA Draft but played two seasons with the Golden State Warriors, who waived Oliver on December 5, 2002. With the Warriors, Oliver played a mostly backup role in 35 games, averaging 1.8 points, 0.7 rebounds, and 1.3 assists per game.

Oliver's final NBA game was played on December 3rd, 2002 in a 110 - 89 win over the Denver Nuggets where he recorded 5 points and 1 rebound.

On February 3, 2003, he signed with the Greenville Groove of the NBA Development League (D-League). The Groove waived Oliver on February 23, and Oliver signed with the D-League team Asheville Altitude two days later. In October 2003, Oliver signed with the expansion team of the USBL, Cedar Rapids River Raiders, in his home state of Iowa; the River Raiders would begin play in the spring of 2004. He then signed with the Dakota Wizards of the CBA in February 2004. The Wizards won the 2004 CBA title, and Oliver was a backup for the Wizards.

Oliver began playing in European leagues in 2004.

With Śląsk Wrocław of the Polish Basketball League, Oliver scored 17 points to bring the team to third place in the tournament.

From 2007 to 2010, Oliver played for the Dutch team EiffelTowers, which won Dutch Basketball League Cups in 2008 and 2009.

Coach
In 2011, he became the head of basketball operations at North Dakota. In 2014, he became an assistant basketball coach at Illinois State. On April 20, 2017, Oliver was named an assistant at Wisconsin under coach Greg Gard.

Notes

External links
 Illinois State bio
 North Dakota bio
 Oliver bio from basketball-reference.com
DraftExpress stats (includes European league stats) 

1978 births
Living people
ABA League players
American expatriate basketball people in Croatia
American expatriate basketball people in France
American expatriate basketball people in Greece
American expatriate basketball people in the Netherlands
American expatriate basketball people in Poland
American expatriate basketball people in Slovenia
American men's basketball players
Asheville Altitude players
Basketball players from Illinois
Basketball players from Iowa
Dakota Wizards (CBA) players
Golden State Warriors players
Greenville Groove players
Heroes Den Bosch players
Illinois State Redbirds men's basketball coaches
Iowa Hawkeyes men's basketball players
KK Zadar players
North Dakota Fighting Hawks men's basketball coaches
People from Mason City, Iowa
Point guards
Sportspeople from Greater St. Louis
Sportspeople from Quincy, Illinois
Undrafted National Basketball Association players
Wisconsin Badgers men's basketball coaches